Kostrčani (Istro-Romanian: Costârceån) is a village in Istria County, Croatia. Administratively it belongs to municipality of Kršan. The village is inhabited mostly by Istro-Romanians.

Location 
It is located on the North Eastern part of Istria, 20 km North from Labin, and 11 km from the centre of the municipality Kršan. It is west from the junction point of A8 motorway, and roads number D64 and D500, at the North Western edge of field Čepić.

Population

References

External links 
Official homepage of Kršan
Tourist homepage

Populated places in Istria County
Istro-Romanian settlements